François Joux (born 11 July 1912, date of death unknown) was a French stage and film actor.

Selected filmography
 The Pavilion Burns (1941)
 The Duchess of Langeais (1942)
 The Trump Card (1942)
 Paris Frills (1945)
 The Murderer is Not Guilty (1946)
 Women's Games (1946)
 Once is Enough (1946)
 The Battle of the Rails (1946)
 Not Guilty (1947)
 Antoine and Antoinette (1947)
 Six Hours to Lose (1947)
 Barry (1949)
 Manon (1949)
 The King (1949)
 The Cupid Club (1949)
 A Hole in the Wall (1950)
 Alone in Paris (1951)
 Rue des Saussaies (1951)
 La Putain respectueuse (1952)
 Follow That Man (1953)
 The Lovers of Marianne (1953)
 Alarm in Morocco (1953)
 Endless Horizons (1953)
 Julietta (1953)
 Virgile (1953)
 Faites-moi confiance (1954)
 Adam Is Eve (1954)
 French Cancan (1955)
 Three Days to Live (1957)
 Montparnasse 19 (1958)
 Lift to the Scaffold (1958)

References

Bibliography
 Ann C. Paietta. Saints, Clergy and Other Religious Figures on Film and Television, 1895-2003. McFarland, 2005.

External links

1912 births
Year of death unknown
French male film actors